5'-nucleotidase, cytosolic IA is a protein that in humans is encoded by the NT5C1A gene.

Function

Cytosolic nucleotidases, such as NT5C1A, dephosphorylate nucleoside monophosphates.

References

Further reading 

Proteins